São Pedro Apóstolo is a freguesia (civil parish) of Cape Verde. It covers the western part of the municipality of Ribeira Grande, on the island of Santo Antão.

Settlements

The freguesia consists of the following settlements (population at the 2010 census):
 Chã de Igreja (pop: 672, town)
 Figueiras (pop: 401)
 Garça de Cima (pop: 1,138)
 Ribeira Alta (pop: 170)

References

Ribeira Grande Municipality
Parishes of Cape Verde